Zatko or Zaťko is a surname. Notable people with the surname include:

 Dušan Zaťko (born 1954), Czechoslovak slalom canoeist
 Juraj Zaťko (born 1987), Slovak volleyballer
 Peter Zaťko (born 1983), Slovak wheelchair curler
 Peiter Zatko (born 1970), American computer security researcher
 Štefan Zaťko (born 1962), Slovak football manager